Opuntia dejecta is a species of plant in the cactus family. They are listed in cites appendix ii. Flowers are visited by the broad-billed hummingbird.

Source

References 

dejecta